Owryad (also Romanized as Owryād, Oryād, and Uryād; also known as Ūryāt) is a village in Kuhin Rural District, in the Central District of Kabudarahang County, Hamadan Province, Iran. At the 2006 census, its population was 290, in 62 families.

References 

Populated places in Kabudarahang County